is a town located in Ibaraki Prefecture, Japan. , the town had an estimated population of 18,128 in 7214 households and a population density of 112 persons per km². The percentage of the population aged over 65 was 37.6%.

Geography
Located in central-west Ibaraki Prefecture, Shinsato is bordered by Tochigi Prefecture to the west. The Naka River passes through the town.

Surrounding municipalities
Ibaraki Prefecture
 Mito
 Kasama
 Hitachiōmiya
 Naka
Tochigi Prefecture
 Motegi

Climate
Shirosato has a Humid continental climate (Köppen Cfa) characterized by warm summers and cold winters with heavy snowfall.  The average annual temperature in Shirosato is 13.6 °C. The average annual rainfall is 1390 mm with September as the wettest month. The temperatures are highest on average in August, at around 25.2 °C, and lowest in January, at around 2.8 °C.

Demographics
Per Japanese census data, the population of Shirosato has declined in recent decades.

History
Shirosato was formed on February 1, 2005, from the merger of the town of Jōhoku, the village of Katsura, both from Higashiibaraki District, and the village of Nanakai, from Nishiibaraki District.

Government
Shirosato has a mayor-council form of government with a directly elected mayor and a unicameral town council of 14 members. Shirosato, together with city of Mito, contributes seven members to the Ibaraki Prefectural Assembly. In terms of national politics, the city is part of Ibaraki 1st district of the lower house of the Diet of Japan.

Economy
The economy of Shirosato is primarily agricultural.

Education
Shirosato has five public elementary schools and two public middle schools operated by the town government, and one public high school operated by the Ibaraki Prefectural Board of Education.

Transportation

Railway
Shirosato does not have any passenger train service.

Highway

Noted people from Shirosato
Akihiro Ohata, politician

References

External links

Official Website 

Towns in Ibaraki Prefecture
Shirosato, Ibaraki